Gibson House is a historical museum in Toronto, Ontario, Canada.

Gibson House may also refer to:

 Gibson House (Woodland, California)
 Gibson House (Cincinnati), Ohio
 Gibson House (Jamestown, Pennsylvania)
 Gibson House Museum, in Boston, Massachusetts